Banga Banga or variants may refer to:

 Banga Banga!, a 2010 Korean film
 Banga Banga (Austin Mahone song)
 Banga Banga, a settlement in Idiofa, Democratic Republic of Congo
 "Banga Banga", a song by Thundermug
 Banga-banga, a Nigerian soldier's slouch hat

See also
Banga Banga Hamtori, Japanese cartoon